Lissonota fundator is a species of insect belonging to the family Ichneumonidae.

It is native to Europe.

References

Ichneumonidae